Kennington is a district of London, England.

Kennington may also refer to

 Kennington, Kent, a suburb of Ashford, England
 Kennington, Oxfordshire, England
 Kennington, New Zealand
 Kennington, Victoria, a suburb of Bendigo, Australia

Railway stations
Kennington tube station, London

See also
 Kennington (surname)
 Kensington (disambiguation)